Pseudophallus starksii, also known as the yellowbelly pipefish is a species of marine fish belonging to the family Syngnathidae. They can be found in freshwater streams, rivers, and estuaries ranging from the west coast of Baja California to Ecuador. Reproduction occurs through ovoviviparity in which the males brood eggs before giving live birth.

References

External links 

 Pseudophallus starksii  at FishBase

Syngnathidae
Fish described in 1895